Sir Peter Edward Hall (born 26 July 1938) is a British former diplomat. He was educated at Portsmouth Grammar School and Pembroke College, Cambridge. He was British Ambassador to Yugoslavia from 1989 to 1992 and Ambassador to Argentina from 1993 to 1997.

References

External links
Interview with Peter Hall

1938 births
Living people
People educated at The Portsmouth Grammar School
Alumni of Pembroke College, Cambridge
Ambassadors of the United Kingdom to Yugoslavia
Ambassadors of the United Kingdom to Argentina